The Ayrshire Derby refers to matches between the two professional Scottish football sides based in Ayrshire: Ayr United and Kilmarnock.

The first match was held on 14 September 1910, in the same year that Ayr United were formed. This game was the final of the Ayrshire League in the 1909–10 season, and finished in a 4–4 draw. Ayr United were the first of the clubs to record a win the following season. The six most recent meetings took place in national cup competitions because Kilmarnock have played in a higher division than Ayr since 1993. Up until 1998, both clubs competed in a local cup competition, the Ayrshire Cup, which also involved local junior sides.

The current record for Ayrshire derby games in major competitions stands at 56 wins for Kilmarnock and 48 for Ayr United.

The term Ayrshire Derby has also been used to refer to Scottish Cup matches involving two teams from the county, most recently in the 2018–19 fourth round when Auchinleck Talbot beat Ayr United.

Results table

National competitions
As of March 2022

Table only includes matches between Kilmarnock and Ayr United from 1910. Major fixtures involving Ayr's predecessor clubs are shown below:

1875–76 Scottish Cup Round 1: Kilmarnock 8–0 Ayr Eglinton
1877–78 Scottish Cup Round 2: Ayr Academicals 1–0 Kilmarnock
1880–81 Scottish Cup Round 2: Kilmarnock 6–3 Ayr FC
1887–88 Scottish Cup Round 1: Kilmarnock 8–2 Ayr Thistle
1897–98 Scottish Cup Qualifying Round: Kilmarnock 7–1 Ayr FC
1897–98 Scottish Cup Round 4: Ayr Parkhouse 2–7 Kilmarnock
Scottish Football League Second Division
1897–98: Kilmarnock 5–2 Ayr FC, Ayr FC 0–3 Kilmarnock
1898–99: Ayr FC 1–1 Kilmarnock, Kilmarnock 5–1 Ayr FC

Defunct local competitions

Recent matches
This section shows the ten most recent competitive match-ups between the sides.

In January 2009, the two clubs met for the first time in over seven years. They were drawn together in the Scottish Cup at Somerset Park. The game finished 2–2, Kilmarnock twice taking the lead and Ayr United equalising twice, with the final goal of the game scored by substitute Ayr striker Alex Williams in injury time. Ayr keeper Stephen Grindlay also saved a penalty kick from Kilmarnock's Allan Russell. In the replay at Rugby Park, Ayr United took the lead with a goal from Bryan Prunty, which television replays confirmed had involved the use of his hand. However, Kilmarnock won the tie 3–1 with goals from Simon Ford (twice) and Moroccan Medhi Taouil. This was Kilmarnock's first victory in the derby in a senior competition for seventeen years.

The previous meeting was a Scottish League Cup tie in October 2001. Ayr United had midfielder Paul Sheerin sent off early in the second half, playing the rest of the 90 minutes and extra time with ten men. However, no goals were scored in open play, and Ayr United won 5–4, with Chris Innes of Kilmarnock missing the vital spot-kick. Prior to that, Ayr United recorded 3–0 and 2–0 wins in the Scottish Cup in 1997–98 and 1998–99, the former bringing to an end Kilmarnock's reign as the cup holders. In the 1998–99 match, Andy Walker scored two penalties, the second of them being chipped over the Kilmarnock goalkeeper Gordon Marshall.

2011–12 League Cup Semi-Final
On 28 January 2012, Ayr United and Kilmarnock met at Hampden Park for the League Cup semi-final. Kilmarnock won 1–0 thanks to a 109th-minute goal from Dean Shiels. This was the first time that the Ayrshire derby had taken place in the semi-finals of a major competition and it was also the first derby to be played at a neutral venue. The game also achieved the highest recorded post-World War II crowd of any Ayrshire derby with 25,057 people travelling to Hampden (Kilmarnock versus Ayr United on 19 March 1938 had a crowd of 27,442).

League 
The last league meeting between the sides was on 20 March 1993 at Rugby Park, finishing in a 1–1 draw.  Since then, Kilmarnock have played in the Scottish Premier League and Ayr in the First or Second Divisions. By contrast, in the late 1970s Ayr United played in the then-top tier of Scottish league football with Kilmarnock in the division below. Following Kilmarnock's relegation from the Premiership in 2020–21, the two clubs will share a division for the first time in 28 years in the following season. Kilmarnock would win the first derby of the season on both clubs' opening league day, winning 2–0 at Rugby Park.

Ayrshire Cup 
The two clubs have both won this local competition on many occasions, but the last time it was contested was in 1998, when Kilmarnock won 4–2 at Rugby Park after trailing 2–0 at half time. This match was made even more special with Kilmarnock left back Dylan Kerr jumping into the Moffat Stand to celebrate his superb strike to make it 3–2. The trophy has been won by Kilmarnock on 42 occasions and by Ayr United on 27.

Other matches 
Between 2003 and 2005, a series of annual one-off friendly matches were held in October, sponsored by a local commercial radio station and named the West Sound Trophy. Kilmarnock won the first match at Rugby Park 1–0; the following year at Somerset Park Ayr United won on penalties, having earlier been 2–0 behind; and in the final match Kilmarnock won 4–0 at home.

References

External links 
 Results database at Ayr United Archive Website (Archived version)

Scotland football derbies
Ayr United F.C.
Kilmarnock F.C.
Recurring sporting events established in 1910
Football in East Ayrshire
Football in South Ayrshire